The 1990 Winter Pan American Games were held in Las Leñas, Argentina, from 16 September to 22 September 1990. They were the only Winter Pan American Games. 97 athletes from eight countries participated in one sport (alpine skiing).

Sport 
Alpine skiing
Slalom skiing
Giant slalom
Super-G

Venue

All sporting events took place at the Las Leñas Ski resort in Mendoza Province.

Game highlights

In 1988, members of PASO voted to hold the first Pan American Winter Games at Las Leñas, Argentina in September 1989. It was further agreed that Winter Games would be held every four years. Lack of snow however, forced the postponement of the games until 16–22 September 1990 when only eight countries sent 97 athletes to Las Leñas. Of that total, 76 were from just three countries: Argentina, Canada, and the United States.

On September 16, Néstor Lowel, president of Las Leñas received the Olympic Flag from Antonio Rodríguez, then president of the Argentine Olympic Committee. Aristeo Benavídez, alpine skier that represented Argentina at the 1952 Winter Olympics, lit the Olympic cauldron after Governor José Octavio Bordón declared the games officially opened. The skier Carolina Eiras, who had represented Argentina at the 1988 Winter Olympics and would be the flag bearer in 1992, made the Olympic Oath.

Weather was unseasonably warm and again there was little snow, so only three Alpine Skiing events – the Slalom, Giant Slalom, and Super G were staged. The United States and Canada won all 18 medals.

Participating teams 

 (26)
 (2)
 (5)
 (25)
 (9)
 (1)
 (4)
 (25)

Non-Participating teams

Medal table

See also 

Winter Pan American Games

References

P
Winter
1990 in North American sport
1990 in South American sport
Multi-sport events in Argentina
Pan American Games
Sport in Mendoza Province
Winter multi-sport events
September 1990 sports events in South America
1990 in winter sports
Winter sports competitions in Argentina